The 1990 Basque regional election was held on Sunday, 28 October 1990, to elect the 4th Parliament of the Basque Autonomous Community. All 75 seats in the Parliament were up for election.

The Basque Nationalist Party (EAJ/PNV) won 22 seats, the Socialist Party of the Basque Country (PSE–PSOE) came second with 16 seats, Popular Unity (HB) came third with 13 seats and Basque Solidarity (EA) won 9 seats. The People's Party (PP) and Basque Country Left (EE) each won 6 seats.

Overview

Electoral system
The Basque Parliament was the devolved, unicameral legislature of the autonomous community of the Basque Country, having legislative power in regional matters as defined by the Spanish Constitution of 1978 and the regional Statute of Autonomy, as well as the ability to vote confidence in or withdraw it from a lehendakari.

Voting for the Parliament was on the basis of universal suffrage, which comprised all nationals over 18 years of age, registered in the Basque Country and in full enjoyment of their political rights. The 75 members of the Basque Parliament were elected using the D'Hondt method and a closed list proportional representation, with an electoral threshold of five percent of valid votes—which included blank ballots—being applied in each constituency. Seats were allocated to constituencies, corresponding to the provinces of Álava, Biscay and Guipúzcoa, being allocated a fixed number of 25 seats each to provide for an equal representation of the three provinces in parliament as required under the regional statute of autonomy. This meant that Álava was allocated the same number of seats as Biscay and Gipuzkoa, despite their populations being, as of 1 July 1990: 272,282, 1,160,364 and 679,076, respectively.

The electoral law allowed for parties and federations registered in the interior ministry, coalitions and groupings of electors to present lists of candidates. Parties and federations intending to form a coalition ahead of an election were required to inform the relevant Electoral Commission within ten days of the election call, whereas groupings of electors needed to secure the signature of at least one percent of the electorate in the constituencies for which they sought election, disallowing electors from signing for more than one list of candidates.

Election date
The term of the Basque Parliament expired four years after the date of its previous election, unless it was dissolved earlier. The election decree was required to be issued no later than the twenty-fifth day prior to the date of expiry of parliament and published on the following day in the Official Gazette of the Basque Country (BOPV), with election day taking place between the fifty-fourth and the sixtieth day from publication. The previous election was held on 30 November 1986, which meant that the legislature's term would have expired on 30 November 1990. The election decree was required to be published in the BOPV no later than 23 November 1993, with the election taking place up to the sixtieth day from publication, setting the latest possible election date for the Parliament on Saturday, 5 January 1991.

The lehendakari had the prerogative to dissolve the Basque Parliament at any given time and call a snap election, provided that no motion of no confidence was in process. In the event of an investiture process failing to elect a lehendakari within a sixty-day period from the Parliament re-assembly, the Parliament was to be dissolved and a fresh election called.

Opinion polls
The table below lists voting intention estimates in reverse chronological order, showing the most recent first and using the dates when the survey fieldwork was done, as opposed to the date of publication. Where the fieldwork dates are unknown, the date of publication is given instead. The highest percentage figure in each polling survey is displayed with its background shaded in the leading party's colour. If a tie ensues, this is applied to the figures with the highest percentages. The "Lead" column on the right shows the percentage-point difference between the parties with the highest percentages in a poll. When available, seat projections determined by the polling organisations are displayed below (or in place of) the percentages in a smaller font; 38 seats were required for an absolute majority in the Basque Parliament.

Results

Overall

Distribution by constituency

Aftermath

Notes

References
Opinion poll sources

Other

1990 in the Basque Country (autonomous community)
Basque Country
Regional elections in the Basque Country (autonomous community)
October 1990 events in Europe